Rixlew is an unincorporated community in Prince William County, Virginia, United States. Rixlew lies on Wellington Road adjacent to the city of Manassas.

Unincorporated communities in Prince William County, Virginia
Washington metropolitan area
Unincorporated communities in Virginia